The Cacova Ierii mine is a large open pit mine in the north-western of Romania in Cluj County. Cacova Ierii represents one of the largest iron ore reserves in Romania having estimated reserves of 16.6 million tonnes of ore grading 42% iron metal. The mine has the capability to produce around 415,000 tonnes of iron ore/year.

References 

Iron mines in Romania